John Malcolm Coon (31 October 1929 - 27 June 2010) was an Australian sailor who competed in the 1960 Summer Olympics and in the 1964 Summer Olympics.

References

1929 births
2010 deaths
Australian male sailors (sport)
Olympic sailors of Australia
Sailors at the 1960 Summer Olympics – Dragon
Sailors at the 1964 Summer Olympics – Dragon
20th-century Australian people